IJF or Ijf may refer to:

 International Journalism Festival, annual journalism festival in Italy 
 Internacia Junulara Festivalo, annual Esperanto festival in Italy 
 International Judo Federation
 IJf Blokker (born 1930), Dutch actor